Ivan Stanković (Serbian Cyrillic: Иван Станковић; born 1 March 1983) is a Serbian footballer.

Playing career 
Stanković began his career in 2001 with FK Teleoptik in the Second League of FR Yugoslavia. In 2003, he played in the Serbian League with FK Proleter Zrenjanin. The following season he played in the First League of FR Yugoslavia with Partizan Belgrade FC. He signed with rivals FK Obilić for the 2005 season. After his stint in the top flight he played in the Serbian First League with FK BASK, and FK Mladost Apatin.

In 2008, he went abroad to play in the Macedonian Second Football League with KF Shkëndija. Following his time in Macedonia he signed with ŠK Futura Humenné. After a year abroad he returned to Serbia to play with FK Slavija Kragujevac, FK Bežanija, and FK Radnički Obrenovac. In 2012, he went overseas to play in the Canadian Soccer League with the Serbian White Eagles FC.

References 

1983 births
Living people
Sportspeople from Kragujevac
Serbian footballers
Serbia and Montenegro footballers
FK Teleoptik players
FK Proleter Zrenjanin players
FK Partizan players
FK Obilić players
FK BASK players
FK Mladost Apatin players
KF Shkëndija players
ŠK Futura Humenné players
FK Bežanija players
FK Radnički Obrenovac players
Serbian White Eagles FC players
Serbian White Eagles FC non-playing staff
Serbian expatriate footballers
Expatriate footballers in Slovakia
Expatriate footballers in North Macedonia
Expatriate soccer players in Canada
Association football midfielders
Serbian SuperLiga players
Canadian Soccer League (1998–present) players
Serbian First League players
Macedonian Second Football League players